Christopher Joseph Sande (born 10 February 1964) is a Kenyan former professional boxer. As an amateur, he won the bronze medal in the Middleweight division at the 1988 Summer Olympics in Seoul. He shared the podium with Pakistan's Hussain Shah Syed.

Olympic results
1st round bye
Defeated Juan Montiel (Uruguay) KO 3
Defeated Paul Kamela (Cameroon) 5–0
Defeated Francis Wanyama (Uganda) 5–0
Lost to Henry Maske (East Germany) 0–5

Professional career
Sande turned pro in 1989 and had limited success. He was a journeyman fighter best known for his losses against Robert Allen, Chris Johnson, Tim Littles, Luis Ramon Campas, and Alejandro Garcia.  Sande retired in 2001 with a record of 19–19–2.

Professional boxing record

|-
|align="center" colspan=8|19 Wins (7 knockouts, 12 decisions), 19 Losses (9 knockouts, 10 decision), 2 Draws, 1 No Contest 
|-
| align="center" style="border-style: none none solid solid; background: #e3e3e3"|Result
| align="center" style="border-style: none none solid solid; background: #e3e3e3"|Record
| align="center" style="border-style: none none solid solid; background: #e3e3e3"|Opponent
| align="center" style="border-style: none none solid solid; background: #e3e3e3"|Type
| align="center" style="border-style: none none solid solid; background: #e3e3e3"|Round
| align="center" style="border-style: none none solid solid; background: #e3e3e3"|Date
| align="center" style="border-style: none none solid solid; background: #e3e3e3"|Location
| align="center" style="border-style: none none solid solid; background: #e3e3e3"|Notes
|-align=center
|Loss
|
|align=left| Alejandro Garcia
|TKO
|4
|6 July 2001
|align=left| Jai Alai Fronton, Tijuana, Baja California
|align=left|
|-
|Loss
|
|align=left| Luis Ramon Campas
|UD
|10
|16 June 2001
|align=left| Centro de Usos Multiples, Hermosillo, Sonora
|align=left|
|-
|Loss
|
|align=left| Rito Ruvalcaba
|KO
|6
|15 February 1999
|align=left| Tijuana, Baja California
|align=left|
|-
|Loss
|
|align=left| Ramon Pedro Moyano
|PTS
|12
|17 October 1998
|align=left| Conrad Hotel & Casino, Punta del Este
|align=left|
|-
|Loss
|
|align=left| Nicholas Martinez
|UD
|6
|11 July 1998
|align=left| Long Beach, California
|align=left|
|-
|Loss
|
|align=left| Tim Shocks
|TKO
|1
|4 March 1998
|align=left| Lucky Eagle Casino, Rochester, Washington
|align=left|
|-
|Loss
|
|align=left| Manny Sobral
|UD
|10
|1 October 1997
|align=left| Lucky Eagle Casino, Rochester, Washington
|align=left|
|-
|Loss
|
|align=left| Luis Ramon Campas
|UD
|10
|2 June 1997
|align=left| Tijuana, Baja California
|align=left|
|-
|Draw
|
|align=left| Julio "Cuban Lover" Garcia
|PTS
|8
|5 March 1997
|align=left| Lucky Eagle Casino, Rochester, Washington
|align=left|
|-
|Draw
|
|align=left| Justin Racine
|PTS
|6
|30 October 1996
|align=left| Lucky Eagle Casino, Rochester, Washington
|align=left|
|-
|Loss
|
|align=left| Joseph Laryea
|UD
|8
|23 April 1996
|align=left| The Palace of Auburn Hills, Auburn Hills, Michigan
|align=left|
|-
|Loss
|
|align=left| Tim Littles
|TKO
|3
|9 March 1996
|align=left| Green Glens Arena, Millstreet
|align=left|
|-
|Loss
|
|align=left| Chris Johnson
|TKO
|2
|22 April 1995
|align=left| MGM Grand Garden Arena, Las Vegas, Nevada
|align=left|
|-
|Loss
|
|align=left| Robert Allen
|KO
|7
|2 November 1994
|align=left| Woodland Hills, California
|align=left|
|-
|Win
|
|align=left| Clarence White
|PTS
|6
|2 July 1994
|align=left| Harveys Lake Tahoe, Stateline, Nevada
|align=left|
|-
|Loss
|
|align=left| Art Serwano
|UD
|4
|13 June 1994
|align=left| Great Western Forum, Inglewood, California
|align=left|
|-
|Loss
|
|align=left| Ray McElroy
|TKO
|4
|2 April 1994
|align=left| Las Vegas, Nevada
|align=left|
|-
|Win
|
|align=left| David Mendez
|KO
|5
|10 January 1994
|align=left| Great Western Forum, Inglewood, California
|align=left|
|-
|Win
|
|align=left| Guillermo Chavez
|TKO
|4
|29 October 1993
|align=left| Ouagadougou
|align=left|
|-
|Win
|
|align=left| Alberto MaChong
|KO
|5
|28 May 1993
|align=left| Bobo-Dioulasso
|align=left|
|-
|Loss
|
|align=left| Nicky Piper
|TKO
|9
|10 April 1993
|align=left| Swansea
|align=left|
|-
|Loss
|
|align=left| Rodney Toney
|PTS
|8
|30 March 1993
|align=left| San Diego Sports Arena, San Diego
|align=left|
|-
|Win
|
|align=left| Otis Pimpleton
|PTS
|8
|4 November 1992
|align=left| Reseda Country Club, Los Angeles, California
|align=left|
|-
|Win
|
|align=left| James Rivas
|PTS
|6
|4 September 1992
|align=left| Reseda Country Club, Los Angeles, California
|align=left|
|-
|No Contest
|
|align=left| James Rivas
|ND
|1
|28 July 1992
|align=left| Reseda Country Club, Los Angeles, California
|align=left|
|-
|Loss
|
|align=left| Warren Williams
|UD
|8
|9 April 1992
|align=left| Bally's Las Vegas, Las Vegas, Nevada
|align=left|
|-
|Win
|
|align=left| Earl Jackson
|TKO
|6
|14 February 1992
|align=left| Las Vegas, Nevada
|align=left|
|-
|Win
|
|align=left| Sonny Brennan
|UD
|6
|10 October 1991
|align=left| Bally's Las Vegas, Las Vegas, Nevada
|align=left|
|-
|Win
|
|align=left| Vinson Durham
|PTS
|10
|12 August 1991
|align=left| Great Western Forum, Inglewood, California
|align=left|
|-
|Win
|
|align=left| James G. Mason
|PTS
|6
|26 March 1991
|align=left| Las Vegas, Nevada
|align=left|
|-
|Loss
|
|align=left| Daniel "Pit Bull" Perez
|UD
|6
|26 October 1990
|align=left| Lujan Building at Expo New Mexico, Albuquerque, New Mexico
|align=left|
|-
|Win
|
|align=left| Roger Orlaineta
|UD
|6
|17 August 1990
|align=left| Bally's Las Vegas, Las Vegas, Nevada
|align=left|
|-
|Win
|
|align=left| Steve Langley
|UD
|6
|15 June 1990
|align=left| Bally's Las Vegas, Las Vegas, Nevada
|align=left|
|-
|Loss
|
|align=left| Lamar Parks
|TKO
|5
|29 April 1990
|align=left| Caesars Atlantic City, Atlantic City, New Jersey
|align=left|
|-
|Win
|
|align=left| Richard Jarvis
|TKO
|1
|1 April 1990
|align=left| Caesars Tahoe, Stateline, Nevada
|align=left|
|-
|Win
|
|align=left| Robert Waymon Jackson
|UD
|6
|16 February 1990
|align=left| Hacienda Hotel, Las Vegas, Nevada
|align=left|
|-
|Win
|
|align=left| Willie L. Kemp
|SD
|4
|15 January 1990
|align=left| Atlantic City Convention Center, Atlantic City, New Jersey
|align=left|
|-
|Win
|
|align=left| James Patterson
|UD
|4
|26 December 1989
|align=left| Bally's Las Vegas, Las Vegas, Nevada
|align=left|
|-
|Win
|
|align=left| Ricky Rios
|TKO
|1
|1 December 1989
|align=left| Hacienda Hotel, Las Vegas, Nevada
|align=left|
|-
|Win
|
|align=left| Juan G. Sanchez
|TKO
|4
|31 October 1989
|align=left| Showboat Hotel and Casino, Las Vegas, Nevada
|align=left|
|-
|Win
|
|align=left| John Tunstall
|UD
|4
|10 October 1989
|align=left| Bally's Las Vegas, Las Vegas, Nevada
|align=left|
|}

References

External links
 

1964 births
Living people
Boxers at the 1988 Summer Olympics
Olympic boxers of Kenya
Olympic bronze medalists for Kenya
Olympic medalists in boxing
Medalists at the 1988 Summer Olympics
Kenyan male boxers
Middleweight boxers